Sitting Bull Mountain is a  double summit mountain in the North Cascades of Washington state. The north summit is higher than the south peak (7680+ ft), and easier to climb (class 3 vs. class 4), however neither peak sees much climbing activity. Its nearest higher peak is Plummer Mountain,  to the south-southwest. The mountain is situated on the crest of the Cascade Range, on the shared border of Snohomish County and Chelan County. Precipitation runoff from Sitting Bull Mountain drains east into Agnes Creek which is a tributary of the Stehekin River, or west into Canyon Creek which is a tributary of the Suiattle River.

Geology

The area was previously an oceanic environment, consisting mainly of sedimentary and volcanic rocks. Glacier Peak, a stratovolcano that is south of Sitting Bull Mountain, began forming in the mid-Pleistocene. Due to Glacier Peak's proximity to Sitting Bull Mountain, volcanic ash is quite common in the area.

Throughout the ice age, the North Cascades were mostly covered in thick glaciers, extending to near Puget Sound. As a result, valleys in the area are deep and u-shaped, and mountains tend to be rocky, with steep slopes and narrow summits.

Climate
Sitting Bull Mountain is located in the marine west coast climate zone of western North America. Most weather fronts originate in the Pacific Ocean, and travel northeast toward the Cascade Mountains. As fronts approach the North Cascades, they are forced upward by the peaks of the Cascade Range, causing them to drop their moisture in the form of rain or snowfall onto the Cascades (Orographic lift). As a result, the west side of the North Cascades experiences high precipitation, especially during the winter months in the form of snowfall. Due to its temperate climate and proximity to the Pacific Ocean, areas west of the Cascade Crest very rarely experience temperatures below  or above . During winter months, weather is usually cloudy, but, due to high pressure systems over the Pacific Ocean that intensify during summer months, there is often little or no cloud cover during the summer. Because of maritime influence, snow tends to be wet and heavy, resulting in high avalanche danger.

See also

 Geography of the North Cascades
 Geology of the Pacific Northwest
Glacier Peak Wilderness

References

External links
 Sitting Bull Mountain weather forecast

Mountains of Washington (state)
Mountains of Snohomish County, Washington
Mountains of Chelan County, Washington
Cascade Range
North American 2000 m summits